Fadrique de Basilea (fl. 1484–1517) was an early printer in Spain. Real name Friedrich Biel, and called also Fridericus de Basilea, Federigo Aleman, he introduced printing in Burgos. Previously he had worked in Basel with Michael Wenssler.

References

Spanish printers
16th-century Spanish businesspeople
16th-century printers